Willem Louis Frederik Christiaan (Frederik) ridder van Rappard (3 May 1798, Arnhem – 9 June 1862, Laren) was a Dutch politician.

1798 births
1862 deaths
Ministers of Finance of the Netherlands
Members of the House of Representatives (Netherlands)
Members of the Senate (Netherlands)
19th-century Dutch lawyers
Dutch nobility
University of Groningen alumni
People from Arnhem